Petrosiidae is a family of sponges, first described in 1980 by Rob van Soest  which  contains the following four genera:
 Acanthostrongylophora Hooper, 1984
 Neopetrosia de Laubenfels, 1949
 Petrosia Vosmaer, 1885
 Xestospongia de Laubenfels, 1932

References

Petrosina
Taxa named by Rob van Soest
Animals described in 1980